Miloš Kruščić (Serbian Cyrillic: Милош Крушчић; born 3 October 1976) is a Serbian football manager and a former professional player. He is currently serving as manager, for Hungarian team Újpest FC in the first division.

In January 2001, Kruščić represented FR Yugoslavia at the Millennium Super Soccer Cup in India, as the team won the tournament. He made two appearances in the process.

Career statistics

External links
 
 

Association football defenders
Expatriate footballers in Russia
FC Rostov players
FK Palilulac Beograd players
FK Radnički Beograd players
FK Spartak Subotica players
FK Zemun players
Russian Premier League players
Serbia and Montenegro expatriate footballers
Serbia and Montenegro expatriate sportspeople in Russia
Serbia and Montenegro footballers
Serbian expatriate footballers
Serbian expatriate sportspeople in Russia
Serbian footballers
Serbian football managers
FK Metalac Gornji Milanovac managers
FK Zemun managers
Footballers from Belgrade
1976 births
Living people
Serbia and Montenegro international footballers
Újpest FC managers
Nemzeti Bajnokság I managers
Serbian expatriate sportspeople in Hungary